Champions Golf Club is a 36-hole private golf club located in Houston, Texas. Established in 1957 by multiple major champions Jack Burke Jr. and Jimmy Demaret, who were both raised in the city, Champions carries a long history for Houston golf. Burke (b.1923) won the Masters and PGA Championship in 1956 and Demaret  was the first to win three Masters (1940, 1947, 1950).

The Cypress Creek course was designed by Ralph Plummer and opened for play  in 1959. It was the site of the 1967 Ryder Cup, 1969 U.S. Open, five PGA Tour Championships, and the U.S. Amateur in 1993. It also hosted the Houston Champions International on the PGA Tour five times, which is now the Houston Open.

In 2018, the Cypress Creek course temporarily closed for a renovation in advance of hosting the 2020 US Women's Open. The renovation was completed by architect Chet Williams, known for his work across Texas including the design of Whispering Pines Golf Club in Trinity, TX. 

  

The second course is the Jackrabbit course, which is used in qualifying rounds for the various USGA Championships the club has hosted, while Cypress Creek is the primary tournament venue. In 2020, golfers for the U. S. Women's Open played the first or second round at Jackrabbit with the other rounds at Cypress Creek because of the December tournament date caused by a global pandemic.  The Jackrabbit course opened in 1964 and was designed by George Fazio, later renovated by nephew Tom Fazio.

The competitive course record at Cypress Creek is held by Chad Campbell, who shot a 10-under-par 61 in the third round en route to winning the Tour Championship in 2003, the last held at Champions.

Tournaments
1966 Houston Champions International - Arnold Palmer
1967 Houston Champions International - Frank Beard
1967 Ryder Cup - U.S. team defeated Great Britain 23½ to 8½
1968 Houston Champions International - Roberto De Vicenzo
1969 U.S. Open - Orville Moody
1970 Houston Champions International - Gibby Gilbert
1971 Houston Champions International - Hubert Green
1973 Southern Amateur - Ben Crenshaw
1980 Southern Amateur - Bob Tway
1990 Nabisco Championship - Jodie Mudd
1993 U.S. Amateur - John Harris
1997 Tour Championship - David Duval
1998 U.S. Women's Mid-Amateur - Virginia Derby Grimes
1999 Tour Championship - Tiger Woods
2001 Tour Championship - Mike Weir
2003 Tour Championship - Chad Campbell
2017 U.S. Women's Mid-Amateur - Kelsey Chugg
2020 U.S. Women's Open - Kim A-lim

The club also hosts the Champions Cup Invitational, one of the premiere two-man best-ball amateur events, since 1961.

Notable History

Ben Hogan 
Ben Hogan was a frequent visitor to Champions and played in several tournaments hosted at the club. He played the last tournament of his career on the Cypress Creek course in 1971 after making a quintuple-bogey on Hole #4, a challenging par 3. Hogan hit his tee shot into the vegetation on the bank of the Cypress Creek and injured his knee searching for his ball. After deeming it unplayable, he returned to the tee box and hit two more shots into the Creek. He played his seventh shot onto the green and two putt for a score of 9.

Phil Mickelson 
Phil Mickelson visited Champions Golf Club in 1999 for putting lessons from Jackie Burke. Mickelson quipped that Billy Ray Brown warned him about missing short putts in front of Jackie, because Burke was notorious for punching unsuspecting students saying "It's got to hurt when you miss those!"

References

External links

Oob Golf – scorecards – Champions Golf Club
Official Facebook Page

1957 establishments in Texas
Golf clubs and courses designed by Tom Fazio
Golf clubs and courses in Texas
Ryder Cup venues
Sports venues completed in 1957
Sports venues in Houston
Golf in Houston